Sülgoja   is a village in Räpina Parish, Põlva County in southeastern Estonia.

Tsõõrikmäe meteorite crater is located in this village. The crater is about 9.500-10.00 years old. The crater's diameter is 38–40 m.

References

Villages in Põlva County